Spilarctia nigrovittatus is a moth in the family Erebidae. It was described by Shōnen Matsumura in 1911. It is found in Taiwan.

References

N
Endemic fauna of Taiwan
Moths of Taiwan
Moths described in 1911